The World Squash Championships are squash events for men and women organised by the Professional Squash Association. The men's event was first held in 1976 in London, England and the women's was inaugurated in 1976 in Brisbane, Australia.

Overview
The British Open had for many years been generally considered to be the sport's effective world championship, and this continued to be the case until the World Open (now called World Championship) was established. 

The women's World Championship was held once every two years until the early 1990s, when it became an annual event. The men's event has been held every year since 1976, except for a two-year gap in 2000 and 2001 when it was not held due primarily to difficulties in securing sponsorship. In recent years, the men's World Championship has been part of the PSA World Series.

Results

Men's Finals
Source:

Women's finals
Source:

Note:
 Vicki Hoffman was known as Vicki Cardwell from 1982
 Cassie Jackman was also known as Cassie Campion
 Carol Owens switched nationality in 2001.
 Natalie Pohrer was later known as Natalie Grainger.
 Natalie Grinham represented Netherlands from 2007 onwards.
 The 2013 edition was postponed until March 2014.
 The 2015 edition was postponed until April 2016.
 The 2016 edition was held in April 2017.

Most Finals & Titles

Mens

Womens

Medals

Mens (1976 to present)

Womens (1976 to present)

See also 
 World Doubles Squash Championships
 British Open Squash Championships

References

External links 
 World Squash Federation website

 
Squash tournaments
Squash